The 72nd Golden Globe Awards, honoring the best in film and American television of 2014, was broadcast live from the Beverly Hilton Hotel in Beverly Hills, California on January 11, 2015, by NBC. The ceremony was produced by Dick Clark Productions in association with the Hollywood Foreign Press Association. George Clooney was announced as the Cecil B. DeMille Lifetime Achievement Award honoree on September 14, 2014. Tina Fey and Amy Poehler were the co-hosts for the third consecutive time. The nominations were announced on December 11, 2014 by Kate Beckinsale, Peter Krause, Paula Patton and Jeremy Piven. The Affair, Birdman, Boyhood, Fargo, The Theory of Everything, and Transparent were among the films and television shows that received multiple awards.

Winners and nominees

These are the nominees for the 72nd Golden Globe Awards. Winners are listed at the top of each list.

Film

Films with multiple nominations
The following 12 films received multiple nominations:

Films with multiple wins
The following 3 films received multiple wins:

Television

Series with multiple nominations
The following 15 series received multiple nominations:

Series with multiple wins
The following 3 series received multiple wins:

Presenters
The Hollywood Foreign Press Association announced the following presenters:

 Amy Adams with Best Actor in a Motion Picture – Musical or Comedy
 Jennifer Aniston and Benedict Cumberbatch with Best Supporting Actor – Motion Picture
 Kate Beckinsale and Adrien Brody with Best Actress – Miniseries or Television Film
 Jack Black introduced Boyhood
 Don Cheadle and Julianna Margulies with Cecil B. DeMille Award
 Bryan Cranston and Kerry Washington with Best Actress in a Television Series – Comedy or Musical and Best Television Series – Comedy or Musical
 Jamie Dornan and Dakota Johnson with Best Supporting Actress – Series, Miniseries or Television Film
 Robert Downey Jr. with Best Motion Picture – Musical or Comedy
 David Duchovny and Katherine Heigl with Best Actor in a Television Series – Drama
 Anna Faris and Chris Pratt with Best Actress in a Television Series – Drama
 Colin Farrell and Lupita Nyong'o with Best Foreign Language Film
 Colin Firth introduced The Imitation Game
 Jane Fonda and Lily Tomlin with Best Actor in a Television Series – Comedy or Musical
 Harrison Ford with Best Director – Motion Picture
 Ricky Gervais with Best Actress in a Motion Picture – Musical or Comedy
 Bill Hader and Kristen Wiig with Best Screenplay
 Kevin Hart and Salma Hayek with intro of Miss Golden Globe and Best Animated Feature Film
 Katie Holmes and Seth Meyers with Best Supporting Actor – Series, Miniseries or Television Film
 Kate Hudson introduced Into the Woods
 Jared Leto with Best Supporting Actress – Motion Picture
 Adam Levine and Paul Rudd with Best Television Series – Drama
 Jennifer Lopez and Jeremy Renner with Best Miniseries or Television Film and Best Actor – Miniseries or Television Film
 Melissa McCarthy introduced St. Vincent
 Matthew McConaughey with Best Actress in a Motion Picture – Drama
 Sienna Miller and Vince Vaughn with Best Original Score
 Clive Owen introduced The Theory of Everything
 Gwyneth Paltrow with Best Actor in a Motion Picture – Drama
 Prince with Best Original Song
 Meryl Streep with Best Motion Picture – Drama
 Channing Tatum introduced Foxcatcher
 Naomi Watts introduced Birdman
 Owen Wilson introduced The Grand Budapest Hotel
 Oprah Winfrey introduced Selma
 Catherine Zeta-Jones introduced Pride

Reception
The show received mixed to positive reviews, with critics praising hosts Tina Fey and Amy Poehler's jokes as well as the multitude of political commentary in speeches. However, the ceremony’s lack of energy and adherence to routine faced negative criticism.
Sean O’Neal of The A.V. Club lamented Fey and Poehler’s previous announcement that this would be their final year hosting—“Hosts Tina Fey and Amy Poehler reminded everyone why they will be sorely missed next year”—which presenter Meryl Streep echoed as she introduced the “Best Motion Picture—Drama” category. Jethro Nededog of The Wrap was among many reviewers to praise Fey and Poehler, though he wished they had appeared more often throughout the ceremony, claiming, “the fun was front-loaded”.

Comedian Margaret Cho appeared at several instances as a disapproving North Korean film critic, parodying North Korea's reaction and condemnation of the film The Interview two months earlier. Cho had previously played Kim Jong-Il and Kim Jong-Un on Fey’s comedy series 30 Rock, the latter role garnering Cho a Primetime Emmy Award nomination for Outstanding Guest Actress in a Comedy Series. Some reviewers enjoyed the recurring gag and Cho’s skewering of Best Television Series – Musical or Comedy nominee Orange Is the New Blacks placement in the “Comedy” category. Others found Cho's appearances "interminable".

Of note during the ceremony were overt references to oppressed populations and current political events in several victors' speeches. Best Supporting Actress – Series, Miniseries or Television Film winner Joanne Froggatt, referencing her Downton Abbey character Anna Bates's experience with sexual assault, addressed real-world survivors of sexual abuse and rape. Best Actor – Television Series Musical or Comedy winner Jeffrey Tambor thanked the transgender community and Transparent creator Jill Soloway dedicated her award to recent trans suicide victim Leelah Alcorn. Best Original Song winner Common alluded to the Ferguson, Missouri police's shooting of Michael Brown as well as to the 2014 NYPD officer killings by armed civilians. Best Actress – Television Series Musical or Comedy winner Gina Rodriguez mentioned her programs's relevance to Latino viewers, and Best Supporting Actor – Series, Miniseries or Television Film winner Matt Bomer expressed solidarity and remorse for the LGBT victims of the AIDS crisis.

Ratings
The ceremony averaged a Nielsen 12.6 rating/19 share and was watched by 19.3 million viewers. This rating was an eight percent decline from the previous ceremony's viewership of 20.9 million, the highest in a decade.

References

External links
 
 
 

2014 film awards
2014 television awards
072
Golden Globe
January 2015 events in the United States